Kyle's Mill House is a historic home located near Harrisonburg, Rockingham County, Virginia. It was built about 1750, and was built as a two-story, hall-parlor plan log dwelling with a side gable roof.  It was expanded about 1826 to a central-hall plan, a rear ell was added in 1903, and the house was renovated in 1986.  The house is clad in weatherboard and has exterior end chimneys.

It was listed on the National Register of Historic Places in 2001.

References

Houses on the National Register of Historic Places in Virginia
Houses completed in 1750
Houses in Rockingham County, Virginia
National Register of Historic Places in Rockingham County, Virginia